Rossana Lacayo de Herguedas known professionally as Rossana Lacayo (born 3 September 1956) is a Nicaraguan photographer, scriptwriter, and filmmaker. She is considered a pioneer of Nicaraguan cinema as stated by the Nicaraguan Cultural Institute. In 2003 she founded Gota Films  (Nicaragua) an independent film company. She is a member of ANCI (Nicaraguan Association of Cinematography, in Spanish Asociación Nicaragüense de Cine). Lacayo resides in Nicaragua with her family.

Education and professional career
Rossana Lacayo was born in Managua but she studied high school and graduated from the Madeira School (1975) located in Virginia, USA. After high school she studied at Duke University, in North Carolina, USA and graduated with a degree in Economy (1979). In 2010 she graduated with a degree in Documentary Production (in Spanish, Documental de Creación) from the Universidad Autónoma del Estado de Morelos, located in Mexico. Although she studied economy she has stated that she was interested in photography since she was a preteen and she was given a camera. During her students university years she participated as photographer in her school's newspaper.

Early in the 1980s she returned to Nicaraguan and got a job as the official photographer of the newly formed Nicaraguan Ministry of Culture (in Spanish, Ministerio de Cultura de Nicaragua. In 1982 she traveled for a short period to El Salvador to cover the war as photographer and she has stated that she almost lost her life. In 1983 she was transferred to the Nicaraguan Institute of Cinematography  INCINE (in Spanish, Instituto Nicaragüense de Cine) where she started working in the documentary production department and quickly became its chief.

According to the Nicaraguan film historian, Karly Gaitán Morales, it was in 1982 when Lacayo started to work as a professional filmmaker, when as part of INCINE, she met and worked with international movie directors like the Chilean Miguel Littín. She acquires extensive experience while working with filmmakers and actors from Mexico, France, and Cuba. Her first documentary as director was Estos sí pasarán (1984) a documentary that participated in the film festivals in Canada and Sweden. The film was also selected for the 58th Edition (1985) for the Academy Awards in Hollywood.

Even though Lacayo has worked most of her life as a filmmaker, she never abandoned photography, an activity that she considers her passion and that she maintained during the 1980s while working at INCINE.  She shot a large number of movie stills from all the projects in which she was involved. In early 2000s Lacayo started to shoot photos of the daily lives of the people that live in La Chureca which is the dumpster in Managua and the largest of Nicaragua. In 2012 Lacayo was selected by the World Bank to participate, with four of her photos of the dumpster, in an exhibit titled El Cambio in Washington, DC. The following year she made a documentary on the same subject titled San Francisco de La Chureca (2013).

Recognition
On 1 March 2008, Rossana Lacayo received Order of the Cultural Independence Rubén Darío for her work as a pioneer of the Nicaraguan cinema – an award given by the Nicaraguan government to outstanding individuals.

Awards
Press Award at the DOK Liepzig – XXXI International Festival of Documentary and Animation, Germanu (1988) for her documentary Un secreto para mí sola (1988) about the Nicaraguan poet Vidaluz Meneses.
Third Coral Award at the X International Film Festival of Havana, Cuba (1988) for her work Vida en el amor, corto sobre Ernesto Cardenal (1988).
Award for Art Direction at the Festival de Granada Cines del Sur, Spain (2006) for her work Brisa Nocturna (2006) – for this film she also received a Best Actress Award for the leading actress Elena de Sojo at the San Francisco Short Film Festival (2006) and Best Production Award at the Bruxelles Film Festival, Belgium (2006).
 Honor Mention Award at the  VI Bienal de Artes Visuales, Managua, Nicaragua (2007) for her short film Equívoco, a film that also received the Special Mention Award at the Festival Internacional de Cine de Barcelona, Spain, Best Actress at the San Francisco Golden Gate Fiction and Documentary Festival, all awards in 2007. In 2008 the film received more awards like the  Best Edition Award at the Festival du Cinéma de Paris and the Award for Art Production at the Philadelphia Documentary & Fiction Film Festival.
Audience Award forBest Documentary for her work Pikineras at the 7th Festival de Cine Político, Social, y de Derechos Humanos (2013), Valparaíso, Chile.

Complete filmography

References

External links
 Rossana Lacayo YouTube. Retrieved 2014-06-08.
 Gota Films (Nicaragua). Official Web Site. Retrieved 2014-06-08.

1956 births
Nicaraguan women film directors
Living people
People from Managua
Duke University Trinity College of Arts and Sciences alumni